Agarabi, also called Bare, is a Kainantu language spoken in Agarabi Rural LLG, Eastern Highlands Province, Papua New Guinea.

Phonology

Consonants 

 Sounds  may fluctuate to fricative sounds  when between oral vowels.
 Sounds  may also be heard as voiced  within complex syllable nuclei.
  may be heard as  when before .
  can be heard as either a tap  or a trill .
  may occasionally fluctuate to a fricative .

Vowels 

References

External links
New Testament in Agarabi

Kainantu–Goroka languages
Languages of Eastern Highlands Province